Kummi Paattu is a 1999 Tamil-language drama film directed by Kasthuri Raja. The film stars Prabhu and Devayani in leading roles, with Sivakumar, Raadhika and Urvashi in other pivotal roles. The film, which has music composed by Ilaiyaraaja, released in May 1999.

Cast 

 Prabhu as Kanagaraasu
 Devayani as Amaravathi
 Sivakumar as Dharmaraasu
 Raadhika as Ramathaayi
 Urvashi as Kamatchi
 Ranjith as Selvarasu
 Manorama
 Vadivelu
 Anandaraj as Pachhamalayan
 Ponnambalam as Pachhamalayan's son
 Bobby as Pachhamalayan's son
 Vinu Chakravarthy as Amaravathi's father
 K. S. Jayalakshmi as Amaravathi's mother
 Sindhu as Pachhamalayan's wife
 Mannangatti Subramaniam as Sornamuthu
 Kavithasri in a special appearance
 Sharmili in a special appearance
 Alphonsa in a special appearance

Soundtrack

Release 
The film opened to mixed reviews, with a critic noting "there is nothing new in the storyline" and that "they have wasted the talents of a lot of big stars".

References

External links 
 

1999 films
1990s Tamil-language films
Films scored by Ilaiyaraaja
Films directed by Kasthuri Raja